Buchanan High School may refer to:

 Buchanan High School (Coatbridge), Scotland
 Buchanan High School (Clovis, California), United States
Buchanan High School (Michigan), United States